The 2022–23 Liga de Expansión MX season is the third professional season of the second-tier football division in Mexico. The season is divided into two championships—the Torneo Apertura and the Torneo Clausura—each in an identical format and each contested by the same eighteen teams. The Apertura tournament began on 24 June 2022. The Clausura tournament will begin in January 2023.

Changes from the previous season
The Liga de Expansión MX is a Mexican football league founded in 2020 as part of the Mexican Football Federation's "Stabilization Project", which has the primary objective of rescuing the financially troubled teams from the Ascenso MX and prevent the disappearance of a second-tier league in Mexico, for which there will be no promotion and relegation during the following six years. The project also attempts for Liga MX and former Ascenso MX teams to consolidate stable projects with solid basis, sports-wise and administrative-wise, financially wise and in infrastructure. 

On April 21, 2022, Tampico Madero were sold and relocated to La Paz as Club Atlético La Paz.

On April 5, 2022, Atlante, Atlético Morelia, UAT, U. de G., and  Venados applied for promotion certification to restart the promotion and relegation process. The league required four teams to be certified for promotion before reactivating it.  On May 13, 2022, U. de G. was the only team that met all requirements for promotion to Liga MX. Atlético Morelia did not complete the certification process.

On June 1, 2022, the rule that awarded an extra point to teams that won their away matches was abolished.

On June 14, 2022, Durango was accepted as a new member of the league after passing the certification process to join the competition, Durango was the champion of the 2021–22 Serie A de México season.

On November 7, 2022, the league owner's assembly announced the 2023–24 promotion certification process for Liga de Expansión MX teams would begin in January 2023 and would be finalized in May 2023.

Stadiums and locations

Personnel and kits

Managerial changes

Apertura 2022
The defending champions were Atlético Morelia. The tournament began on 24 June 2022.

Regular season

Standings

Positions by Round

Results
Each team plays once all other teams in 17 rounds regardless of it being a home or away match.

Regular Season statistics

Top goalscorers 
Players sorted first by goals scored, then by last name.

Source: Liga de Expansión MX

Hat-tricks 

(H) – Home ; (A) – Away

  First goal of the season:  José Cobián for Zacatecas against Celaya (24 June 2022)
  Last goal of the season:  Eduardo Banda for UAT against Celaya (16 October 2022)

Discipline

Team 
 Most yellow cards: 64
 Oaxaca
 Most red cards: 8
 Tepatitlán
 Fewest yellow cards: 39
 Atlante
 Tapatío
 Fewest red cards: 0
 Celaya
Source Liga de Expansión MX

Attendance

Per team
A match played behind closed doors is not included.

Highest and lowest

Source: Liga de Expansión MX

Final phase

Reclassification

|}

Matches

Bracket

Quarter-finals
The first legs were played between 25–26 October, and the second legs were played between 28–29 October.

|}

First leg

Second leg

U. de G. won 3–2 on aggregate.

3–3 on aggregate. Sonora advanced as the higher seed in the classification table.

Celaya won 2–0 on aggregate.

Atlante won 4–2 on aggregate.

Semi-finals
The first legs were played on 2 November, and the second legs were played on 5 November.

|}

First leg

Second leg

Celaya won 3–1 on aggregate.

Atlante won 2–1 on aggregate.

Finals
The first leg was played on 9 November, and the second was played on 12 November.

|}

First leg

Second leg

Atlante won 3–1 on aggregate.

Clausura 2023
The Clausura tournament began on 4 January 2023. The defending champions are Atlante.

Regular season

Standings

Positions by Round

Results
Each team plays once all other teams in 17 rounds regardless of it being a home or away match.

Regular Season statistics

Top goalscorers 
Players sorted first by goals scored, then by last name.

Source: Liga de Expansión MX

Hat-tricks 

(H) – Home ; (A) – Away

  First goal of the season:  Carlos Monges for Celaya against Cancún (4 January 2023)

Discipline

Team 
 Most yellow cards: 43
 Celaya
 Most red cards: 4
 Oaxaca
 Fewest yellow cards: 18
 UAT
 Fewest red cards: 1
 Sonora
 Tlaxcala
 UAT
 Zacatecas

Source Liga de Expansión MX

Attendance

Per team

Highest and lowest

Source: Liga de Expansión MX

Coefficient table
As of the 2020–21 season, the promotion and relegation between Liga MX and Liga de Expansión MX (formerly known as Ascenso MX) was suspended, however, the coefficient table will be used to establish the payment of fines that will be used for the development of the clubs of the silver circuit. 

Per Article 24 of the competition regulations, the payment of $MXN3 million from Liga de Expansión clubs will be distributed among the last three positioned in the coefficient table as follows: Last place pays 1.5 million, the penultimate place pays 1 million, and the sixteenth place pays 500 thousand. If any affiliate club or new club from the Liga Premier is ranked in the bottom three at the end of the season, they are exempt from paying any fine and it will not be covered by any other club. Any club that does not pay their corresponding fine, for any reason, will be dissafiliated. The team that finishes last on the table will start the following season with a coefficient of zero. If the last ranked team repeats as the last ranked team in the 2023–24 season coefficient table, they will be fined an additional $MXN1 million.

Last update: 19 March 2023
 Rules for fine payment: 1) Fine coefficient; 2) Goal difference; 3) Number of goals scored; 4) Head-to-head results between tied teams; 5) Number of goals scored away; 6) Fair Play points
 F = Fined.
Source: Liga de Expansión

Aggregate table 
The Aggregate table is a sum of the Apertura 2022 and Clausura 2023 tournament standings. The aggregate table is used to determine seeding for the "Campeón de Campeones" Final.

References

External links
 Official website of Liga de Expansión MX

Liga de Expansión MX season